Puerto Rico Highway 103 (PR-103) is a rural road that connects from the PR-114, near Hormigueros, to the PR-101, in Cabo Rojo.

History
PR-103 is the old road from Hormigueros, passing through the center of Cabo Rojo, until the PR-101 (which connects from Boquerón to Lajas). Therefore, the PR-100 is a road to replace PR-103 because it is a faster and more comfortable road.

Major intersections

See also

 List of highways numbered 103

References

External links
 

103
Cabo Rojo, Puerto Rico